Joseph Smith (1805–1844), founder of the Latter Day Saint movement, taught and practiced polygamy during his ministry, and married multiple women during his lifetime. Smith and some of the leading quorums of the church he founded publicly denied he taught or practiced it.

In 1852, leaders of the Church of Jesus Christ of Latter-day Saints (LDS Church) acknowledged that Smith had practiced plural marriage and produced a written revelation of Smith's that authorizes its practice. Smith's lawful widow Emma Smith, his son Joseph Smith III, and most members of the Reorganized Church of Jesus Christ of Latter Day Saints (RLDS Church) attempted for years to refute the evidence of plural marriages. They pointed to the historical record that Joseph Smith publicly opposed the practice of polygamy; the suggestion of the RLDS Church was that the practice of polygamy began in Utah under the leadership of Brigham Young.

The first publication of a list of women alleged to be Smith's plural wives was in 1887, by Andrew Jenson, an assistant LDS Church historian. It included 27 women besides Emma Smith. There are currently 49 women on this list.  However, historians disagree as to the number and identity of the plural wives Smith had. Various scholars and historians, including Fawn M. Brodie, George D. Smith, and Todd Compton, have attempted to identify the women who married Smith. The discrepancy is created by the lack of documents to support some of the alleged marriages. As Compton has stated, for many of these marriages, "absolutely nothing is known of [the] marriage after the ceremony." Apart from his marriage to Emma, Smith's marriages were not solemnized under any civil authority and were therefore solely religious unions.

List of wives

Allegations of children born to polygamous wives 
Research by Ugo A. Perego, a geneticist and member of the LDS Church, has shown that a number of children of Smith's alleged polygamous relationships were not his genetic offspring. The following table lists some of the children born to Smith's alleged polygamous wives as well as those ruled out by genetic testing:

See also 

 Children of Joseph Smith
 List of Latter Day Saint practitioners of plural marriage
 List of Brigham Young's wives

References

Citations

Bibliography 

 .
 .
 . (1st ed. 1945)
 .
 .
 .
 .
 .
 . Online reprint  from the Book Of Abraham Project (BYU) at boap.org 
 .
 .
 .
 . See also: Mormon Enigma: Emma Hale Smith
 .
 .
 .
 .
 .
 .
 .

External links 

 information presented by Brian C. and Laura Harris Hales

 

Wives
Smith, wives
Mormonism and polygamy
Joseph Smith's Wives
 Wives of Joseph Smith
Smith, Joseph
19th-century Mormonism
Lists of 19th-century people
 
 List
Smith, Joseph wives
Lists of American women
Lists of wives